Brooklyn drill is a regional subgenre of drill music, centered in Brooklyn, New York, that began as derivative of the drill music scene in Chicago and later became derivative of UK drill with its 808 percussion and sliding notes by producers from the UK drill scene. Brooklyn drill emerged around 2014 with the single "Hot Nigga" from the rapper Bobby Shmurda. Other early pioneers were rappers Rowdy Rebel, Bam Bino, Money Millz, Dah Dah and Curly Savv. It was again made popular in the mainstream in 2019 by the late Pop Smoke. With the success of his mixtapes, particularly the song “Dior”, Pop Smoke introduced Brooklyn drill into the mainstream music industry. Other notable Brooklyn drill artists include Fivio Foreign, 22Gz, Sheff G, Sleepy Hallow, and Dusty Locane.

History 
Brooklyn drill music first gained attention with the 2014 single "Hot Nigga" from the rapper Bobby Shmurda. Other early pioneers were rappers Bam Bino, Dah Dah and Curly Savv.  The genres is agreed to have been pioneered by 22Gz and Sheff G, largely scaling the potential of the movement. The music became more popular and associated with UK drill production (from producers such as 808Melo, AXL Beats, and Ghosty) with the releases of 22Gz's "Suburban" in 2016 and Sheff G's "No Suburban" in 2017. Both songs went viral and were credited for the rise of Brooklyn drill.

Brooklyn drill music reached mainstream Billboard Hot 100 success with tracks from Pop Smoke ("Welcome to the Party," "Dior," and "Gatti") and Fivio Foreign ("Big Drip" and "Demons"). Pop Smoke was nominated for a 2021 Grammy Award for "Dior."  In 2020, Pop Smoke was murdered during a home invasion in Hollywood Hills, California.

Over time, Brooklyn drill has evolved into a broader New York drill scene. One example is Staten Island rapper CJ, whose hit song "Whoopty" is reminiscent of the Brooklyn drill sound.

Brooklyn drill music has been described as influential among protestors for social change, including some associated with the Black Lives Matter movement.

Characteristics 
The Brooklyn drill sound is a combination of trap, Chicago drill and UK drill (the latter of which brings production influences from grime and UK garage). Characteristic features of Brooklyn drill production include 808 percussion with manipulated vocal samples. The lyrical content of Brooklyn drill music tends to be dark, violent, and aggressive, often discussing gang-related topics.

Controversy

In 2022, some individuals drew connections between the pro-gun content of the genre to real-world gun violence on the streets of New York that had rapidly and recently killed a number of young drill artists, mostly those with origins of Brooklyn and the Bronx.

DJ reaction
In early 2022, in response to the large and rising number of dead young people connected to the music scene, a number of prominent New York DJs and music influencers, including DJ Drewski at Hot 97, Joe Budden, Ebro Darden of "Ebro in the Morning" on  Hot 97, D Teck, either vowed to stop playing gang/diss records or re-iterated their refusal.

Adams administration
In February 2022, NYC mayor Eric Adams had set to ban music videos associated with the drill scene after learning about the killing of 18-year-old rapper C-HII Wvttz. There was a lot of backlash met with this statement. As a result, Adams met with musicians for a conversation on how to approach concerns about drill culture's connections, if any, to gun violence. Artists at the meeting included Maino, Fivio Foreign, B-Lovee, CEO Slow, Bucksy Luciano and Bleezy.

Sample drill

Sample drill, also sometimes called Bronx drill, is a subgenre of Brooklyn drill music, which originated in the early 2020s in The Bronx and prominently uses uncleared samples of older records instead of synthesizers in classic Brooklyn drill.

Sample drill originated during the early 2020s in New York (most prominently, in The Bronx), where producers such as Cash Cobain, EPondabeat, WAR, EvilGiane, and others, started re-using older funk and soul, and pop music songs to create modern yet nostalgic sound. A number of rappers subsequently joined the scene, most prominently, Kay Flock, B-Lovee, Shawny Binladen, DThang Gz, and others.

The easily recognizable samples in sample drill are also said to increase its viral potential. Songs, such as B-Lovee's "My Everything" (sampling "Everything" by Mary J. Blige) gained over 400,000 uses on TikTok and produced two remixes, featuring A Boogie wit da Hoodie and G Herbo. Another early TikTok viral sample drill hit was "Deep End Freestyle" (sampling Fousheé's "Deep End") by Brooklyn native Sleepy Hallow. Despite playing a huge role in genre's spread, Cash Cobain refused to acknowledge that sample drill musicians mostly do songs for TikTok. EPondabeat, another producer involved in the scene, claimed that sampling in used for marketing purpose to invoke listener's relatability.

Sample drill rappers employ a rather wide variety of rapping flows. As Cash Cobain put it, "These little kids from the Bronx are wild. They on demon time. They’re angrier with their shit.", implying that sample drill musicians often use aggressive flows, although Shawny Binladen is known for his whispering flow.

Samples for sample drill come from a variety of sources and these sources may differ depending on producer. Bronx-based Cash Cobain mainly uses round-the-century contemporary R&B and hip hop music sources; meanwhile, EPondabeat, EvilGiane prefer to use soul music and funk recordings for sampling; other producers, such as WAR, don't limit themselves among sampling sources.

Most sample drill songs don't get cleared; sample clearance only happens post-factum when the song in the subgenre becomes viral. Cash Cobain claimed he doesn't care to clear samples for his beats.

Sample drill, since its inception around 2020, already had a mainstream crossover, when Cardi B performed on "Shake It" by Kay Flock. Sample drill has also influenced Jersey drill sound and more commercial drill sound, most particularly the influence can be heard on B.I.B.L.E. by Fivio Foreign, where he sampled "Say My Name" by Destiny's Child.

See also 
 Drill music
 UK drill

References

American hip hop genres
Drill music
American hip hop scenes
East Coast hip hop
Music of New York City
2010s in American music
2020s in American music